Engaged spirituality refers to the beliefs and practices of religious or spiritual people who actively engage in the world in order to transform it in ways consistent with their beliefs. The term was inspired by engaged Buddhism, a concept and set of values developed by the Vietnamese Buddhist monk Thich Nhat Hanh. Engaged spirituality encompasses all the major faith traditions as well as people who refer to themselves as "spiritual but not religious." There are many iterations in practice, but the overarching desire for social transformation unites them. For some in the Catholic tradition, liberation theology guides their form of engaged spirituality.

Common characteristics 
Practitioners of this mode of spirituality tend to hold progressive values which galvanize their efforts for social change. Their actions are infused with the overarching context delineated by their faith tradition. The deep connection between personal and social transformation compel them to engage in social and political activism. Examples include peace activism, civil rights and human rights activism for minority groups, environmental activism, and service on behalf of the poor and homeless.

It may be contrasted with "pop spirituality", which concerns itself primarily with personal psychological betterment, and lacks a deep commitment to social engagement.

Engaged spirituality involves a synthesis of individual subjective experiences and outer collective activities. The individual and the collective mutually support, shape and transform each other. For example, prayer or meditation may serve as a way for an individual to gather strength and gain insight that will guide and enhance the efficacy of their social change efforts. Their experiences gathered in their outer activities which involve relating to and learning from others may influence the texture of their prayer or meditation experiences. Thus, there is a continual interwoven process of spiritual growth and reaffirmation to improving one's local or global community.

See also 
 Network of Spiritual Progressives, an interfaith chapter-based organization
 Sojourners, Christian-based social justice advocacy and awareness-building

References

External links 
 "Engaging Spirituality". Christian spiritual-deepening process for small groups.

Spirituality
Engaged Buddhism